Chinna Kuyil Paaduthu is a 1987 Indian Tamil-language comedy drama film directed by P. Madhavan and written by Bala Murugan. The film stars Sivakumar, Ambika and Master Tinku. It was released on 24 July 1987.

Plot 

Forced by his eight-year-old son, Raju, a widower marries Geetha by hiding his first marriage. When Geetha learns about his first marriage, she calls off her marriage and leaves him.

Cast

Soundtrack 
Music was composed by Ilaiyaraaja and lyrics were written by Vaali, Muthulingam, Ilaiyaraaja and Gangai Amaran.

Reception 
On 7 August 1987, V. S. Thomas of The Indian Express wrote that the film "is an attempt at entertainment with plenty of sentimental incidents tagged together but the effort is not crowned with success as there is a sense of abruptness and artificiality throughout".

References

External links 
 

1987 comedy-drama films
1980s Tamil-language films
1987 films
Films scored by Ilaiyaraaja
Films set in Chennai
Films shot in Ooty
Indian comedy-drama films
Films directed by P. Madhavan